Češko Selo is a village located in the Bela Crkva municipality, in the South Banat District of Serbia. It is situated in the autonomous province of Vojvodina. The village has a Czech ethnic majority (84.78%) and a population of 46 people (2002 census). Its name means "the Czech village", and it is the only settlement with Czech majority in Vojvodina and Serbia.

Ethnic groups (2002 census)
Czechs = 39 (84.78%)
Serbs = 6 (13.04%)
Hungarians = 1 (2.17%)

Historical population

1961: 163
1971: 118
1981: 86
1991: 58

See also
List of places in Serbia
List of cities, towns and villages in Vojvodina

References

Slobodan Ćurčić, Broj stanovnika Vojvodine, Novi Sad, 1996.

External links 
 Map of the Bela Crkva municipality showing the location of Češko Selo

Populated places in Serbian Banat
Populated places in South Banat District
Bela Crkva
Czech communities
Serbian people of Czech descent